D. hercules may refer to:
 Dabasa hercules, a butterfly species
 Dynastes hercules, the Hercules beetle, a rhinoceros beetle species native to the rainforests of Central America, South America and the Lesser Antilles

See also
 Hercules (disambiguation)